Jogaiah or Jogayya may refer to:

 Jogayya, a 2011 Kannada film
 Chegondi Venkata Harirama Jogaiah (born 1937), Indian Parliamentarian
 V. V. Jogayya Pantulu, father of V. V. Giri